Radial Spangle was an American indie rock band from Norman, Oklahoma that released two albums in the 1990s.

The band was formed in 1991 by Alan Laird (vocals, guitar), April Tippens (bass guitar), and former Flaming Lips drummer Richard English. The band members were friends of Mercury Rev, whose David Fridmann engineered their debut album, Ice Cream Headache, released in 1993 on the Mint Tea label.  The album featured boy/girl vocal harmonies and an array of guitar effects. Shortly after the album was released, English was replaced by Kelsey Kennedy. After a further single, "Raze", on Mint Tea, the band signed to Beggars Banquet Records, who issued the "Birthday" EP (which included the three tracks recorded for a session for John Peel's BBC Radio 1 show in July) in late 1993, and the band's second album, Syrup Macrame, again with Fridmann at the controls, in August 1994. The band split up in 1996.

Laird later released Radial Spangle songs under the name The Charm Pops, with recordings that included Tippens and Kennedy and later a variety of musician friends to complete the album.

Discography

Singles, EPs
Raze EP (1993) Mint Tea
Birthday EP (1993) Beggars Banquet

Albums
Ice Cream Headache  (1993) Mint Tea
Syrup Macrame (1994) Beggars Banquet

References

External links
Phares, Heather, "[ allmusic Biography]", allmusic.com, Macrovision Corporation
Details of Radial Spangle's Peel Session
Radial Spangle at discogs.com

1991 establishments in Oklahoma
Indie rock musical groups from Oklahoma
Musical groups established in 1991
Musical groups disestablished in 1996
Musicians from Norman, Oklahoma